Scott Curry may refer to:

 Scott Curry (American football) (born 1975), American football offensive tackle
 Scott Curry (rugby union) (born 1988), New Zealand rugby union player